Jean-Claude Peyronnet (born 7 November 1940) is a member of the Senate of France, representing the Haute-Vienne department.  He is a member of the Socialist Party.

References
Page on the Senate website

1940 births
Living people
French Senators of the Fifth Republic
Socialist Party (France) politicians
Senators of Haute-Vienne
Members of Parliament for Haute-Vienne